The 63rd edition of the Klasika Primavera, a one-day road cycling race, was held on 9 April 2017. It was part of the 2017 UCI Europe Tour as a category 1.1 event.

Teams
Twelve teams started the race. Each team had a maximum of eight riders:

Result

References

Klasika Primavera
2017 UCI Europe Tour
2017 in Spanish road cycling